International Baptist Theological Study Centre (IBTS) is a Baptist Bible college, located in Amsterdam, Netherlands. It is affiliated with the European Baptist Federation.

History 
The Seminary was founded in 1949 in Ruschlikon, Switzerland. It transferred to Prague, Czech Republic, in 1996. Over the summer of 2014 IBTS was established in Amsterdam.

IBTS forms part of a community of organisations known as the Baptist House in Amsterdam. The other members of the community are the Baptist Union of the Netherlands, the Dutch Baptist Seminary and the office of the European Baptist Federation.

The IBTS houses a collection of books in the areas of Baptist identity, mission and practice.

Programmes
Lecturing and supervision is in English and faculty are drawn from throughout Europe. The Centre offers a PHD programme for study and research in a collaborative partnership with the Faculty of Religion and Theology at the  VU (Vrije Universiteit).

It is a founding member of the Consortium of European Baptist Theological schools.

Presidents/rectors/directors of seminary 
 1949—1950 George W. Sadler
 1950—1960 Josef Nordenhaug
 1960—1964 J. D. Hughey
 1964—1970 John D. W. Watts
 1972—1977 Penrose St. Amant
 1978—1981 Isam E. Ballenger
 1982—1983 Clyde E. Fant
 1984—1987 Altus Newel
 1988—1997 John David Hopper
 1997—2013 Keith Grant Jones  
 2013—2014 Parush R Parushev (Acting Rector during the transition period)
 2014—2018 Rev. Dr Stuart Blythe (First Rector of IBTS Centre. Blyth was the first head of the institution to be an IBTS graduate alumnus, obtaining his BD degree magna cum laude at Rüschlikon in 1989.)
2018–Present Rev. Dr. Mike Pears

See also
 European Baptist Federation

References

External links
 Official website
 Consortium of European Baptist Theological schools
 Ebf.org
 IBTS History

Baptist seminaries and theological colleges
Protestantism in the Czech Republic
Educational institutions established in 1949
1949 establishments in Switzerland
1997 establishments in the Czech Republic